Juan Francisco Góngora Mateo (born 14 August 1988) is a Spanish footballer who plays for Águilas FC as a left-back.

Club career
Góngora was born in Fuengirola, Province of Málaga, Andalusia, and started his senior career with Real Betis' C team in the regional leagues. He moved straight to Segunda División B in 2008, joining Marbella FC.

In June 2009, Góngora signed with Real Murcia Imperial also in the third tier. On 30 July 2010, he was definitely promoted to the first team, who had suffered relegation.

Góngora continued to compete in division three the following years, representing Cádiz CF, La Roda CF, Cultural y Deportiva Leonesa and UCAM Murcia CF. With the latter, he achieved promotion to Segunda División at the end of the 2015–16 season after scoring a career-best nine goals.

Góngora made his professional debut on 28 August 2016 at the age of 28, starting and scoring the first in a 1–1 home draw against Córdoba CF.

References

External links

Beticopedia profile 
Stats and bio at Cadistas 1910 

1988 births
Living people
People from Fuengirola
Sportspeople from the Province of Málaga
Spanish footballers
Footballers from Andalusia
Association football defenders
Segunda División players
Segunda División B players
Tercera División players
Primera Federación players
Tercera Federación players
Divisiones Regionales de Fútbol players
UD Fuengirola Los Boliches players
Marbella FC players
Real Murcia Imperial players
Real Murcia players
Cádiz CF players
La Roda CF players
Cultural Leonesa footballers
UCAM Murcia CF players
Unionistas de Salamanca CF players
CF Talavera de la Reina players
Águilas FC players